Ernest Leslie "Les" Wilson (born 14 February 1952 in Wanganui) is a former field hockey goalkeeper from New Zealand, who was a member of the national team that won the golden medal at the 1976 Summer Olympics in Montreal, Canada.

References
 New Zealand Olympic Committee

1952 births
Living people
Field hockey players at the 1976 Summer Olympics
New Zealand male field hockey players
Olympic field hockey players of New Zealand
Olympic gold medalists for New Zealand
Olympic medalists in field hockey
Medalists at the 1976 Summer Olympics